Michael Richards (1673–1721) was an Irish military engineer who rose to become Chief Engineer of Great Britain and Surveyor-General of the Ordnance.

He was the son of Jacob Richards, also a leading military engineer, and the grandson of Solomon Richards. The family were Irish Protestants who owned land in County Wexford. His elder brothers Jacob and John Richards both pursued military careers.

He was commissioned in 1692 (although he may have seen earlier service in the Williamite War in Ireland) and served in Flanders in the Nine Years War. He accompanied an expedition to Newfoundland in 1697. He played a role in rebuilding the town of St. John's which had been destroyed in a French attack.

In 1711, he was appointed as Chief Engineer of Great Britain, a position that had gone unfilled since the death of Sir Martin Beckman in 1702. On the reappointment of John Churchill, 1st Duke of Marlborough, as Master-General of the Ordnance in 1714, his protégé Richards was made Surveyor-General of the Ordnance. Richards moved to Charlton Grove, a hilltop house in Charlton, with a view to the Royal Arsenal in Woolwich. Here, he oversaw the building of the Royal Brass Foundry (1716–17). This Grade I listed building has been attributed to both Sir John Vanbrugh and Nicholas Hawksmoor, but may have been designed by Richards himself.

Richards retired from the Army with the rank of Brigadier General. His marble tomb with an effigy in full armour is in St Luke's Church in Charlton.

References

Bibliography
  (2005): Follow the Sapper: An Illustrated History of the Corps of Royal Engineers. Institution of Royal Engineers. 
  (2007): Vauban Under Siege: Engineering Efficiency and Martial Vigor in the War of the Spanish Succession. BRILL. 
  (2012): Woolwich - Survey of London, Volume 48, Yale Books, London.  (online text)

17th-century Irish people
18th-century Irish people
Irish soldiers
1673 births
1721 deaths
Irish engineers
British Army generals
British military personnel of the War of the Spanish Succession